Jalore Lok Sabha constituency is one of the 25 Lok Sabha (parliamentary) constituencies in Rajasthan state in India, which is spread over Jalore and Sirohi districts.

Vidhan Sabha segments
Presently, Jalore Lok Sabha constituency comprises eight Vidhan Sabha (legislative assembly) segments. These are:

Members of Parliament

Election results

2019 Lok Sabha

2009 Lok Sabha

1998 Lok Sabha
 Buta Singh (IND) : 365,336 votes    
 Genaram (BJP) : 199,251

See also
 Jalore district
 Sirohi district
 List of Constituencies of the Lok Sabha

Notes

Jalore district
Lok Sabha constituencies in Rajasthan
Sirohi district